Anadin is a brand of painkiller sold in the UK and Ireland, launched in 1932, originally by American pharmaceutical company Anacin and currently by Pfizer.

Types 
Several different types of painkiller are sold under the brand. , these include:
 Anadin Original – aspirin and caffeine based
 Anadin paracetamol tablets – launched in 1988
 Anadin ibuprofen tablets – launched in 1997
 Anadin Extra – aspirin, paracetamol and caffeine based (ordinary version launched in 1983 and soluble version in 1992)
 Anadin Joint Pain
 Anadin Liquifast (or Anadin Ultra) – ibuprofen-based liquid capsules (ordinary and "Double strength" versions)

Criticism 
Along with other brands, Anadin's paracetamol tablets have been criticised for being overpriced compared to non-branded versions (e.g. in 2008 16 Anadin Paracetamol tablets each containing 500 mg of paracetamol cost around £2.09 while non-branded equivalents retailed for around £0.35).

See also
 Anacin (American original brand launched in the UK as Anadin in 1932)

References 

Analgesics